After Liu Bang defeated Xiang Yu and proclaimed himself emperor of the Han dynasty, he followed the practice of Xiang Yu and enfeoffed many generals, noblemen, and imperial relatives as kings, the same title borne by the sovereigns of the Shang and Zhou dynasties and by the rulers of the Warring States. Each king had his own semi-autonomous kingdom. This was a departure from the policy of the Qin dynasty, which divided China into commanderies governed by non-hereditary governors.

The kings were divided into two groups: yìxìng wáng, literally "kings of different surnames", and tóngxìng wáng, literally "kings of the same surname", i.e., the imperial surname Liu. The yixing wang represented an obvious threat to the Han empire, and Liu Bang and his successors suppressed them as quickly as was practical: they had disappeared by 157 BC. The tongxing wang were originally left to their own devices but, after the Rebellion of the Seven States in 154 BC, their independence was curtailed. Eventually they lost most of their autonomy. For this reason, the title is also translated as "prince" when referring to later kings of the dynasty, to reflect both their link to the ruling house and the vestigial nature of the former vassal kingdoms.

Yixing Kingdoms
The kings from other dynasties were mostly remnants of the rebellion against the Qin dynasty. Following the Dazexiang Uprising, many noblemen rose in rebellion. Heirs, pretenders, and warlords called themselves "kings" and claimed sovereignty as continuations of the six states previously suppressed by Qin. Among these, Chu was the most powerful. However, its rightful ruler Huai II was assassinated on the orders of the warlord Xiang Yu and the 18 Kingdoms Xiang had formed rose in rebellion against him. Liu Bang, king of Han, ultimately defeated Chu and established the new Han dynasty. The kings who had sided with him were then permitted to maintain their titles and lands. A few other kingdoms were also formed by Liu Bang for generals and favorites.

Although nominally under the rule of the Han, these kings were de facto independent and held considerable power within their territories, which could span several prefectures. As these kingdoms proved unruly, Liu Bang gradually subdued them through conspiracies, wars, and political maneuvering. Many were thus deposed and their kingdoms annexed by Han. As he was dying, the emperor ordered his ministers to swear an oath that only members of the royal house of Liu would be created as kings thenceforth. This injunction was violated by his widow, Empress Dowager Lü, who established several kingdoms with her own relatives as kings. They were destroyed after her death. The last king of the Western Han was Wu Zhu, King Jing of Changsha, who died without an heir in 157 BC. After that, there were no kings outside the royal clan until the end of the Han dynasty, when Cao Cao styled himself King of Wei in AD 216.

Original kingdoms
 Yan – Zang Tu (rebelled in 202 BC but was defeated and replaced by Lu Wan, a Han general, who also plotted rebellion and was replaced in 195 BC by Liu Jian, son of Gaozu)
 Chu – Han Xin (removed in 201 BC and replaced by Liu Jiao, brother of Gaozu)
 Zhao – Zhang Ao (demoted to marquis in 199 BC and replaced by Liu Ruyi, son of Gaozu)
 Huainan – Ying Bu (rebelled in 197 BC but was defeated and replaced by Liu Chang, son of Gaozu)

Established by Liu Bang
 Changsha
 Dai
 Liang

Established by the Empress Dowager Lü
 Lu
 Huaiyang
 Changshan
 Lü

Tongxing Kingdoms
The "kings of the same surname" were members of the House of Liu, sons, brothers, or descendants of the Han emperors. The tradition of creating royal sons as kings continued until the Qing dynasty, during which sons of emperors could also be created as lower nobles. The Han emperors initially felt that creating these kingdoms would strengthen the house, particularly against the other kings. However, these princes became even more dangerous, as they were eligible to succeed the throne.

Several rebellions were attempted by these powerful princes during the reigns of the emperors Jing and Wu. After the Rebellion of the Seven Princes, Emperor Wu reformed the principalities, reducing them to single prefectures and granting superior authority to prime ministers appointed by the central government. The institution continued until the very end of the dynasty, however.

Established by Liu Bang
 Prince of Chu
 Prince of Dai (Liu Zhong, Liu Ruyi and Liu Heng)
 Prince of Qi
 Prince of Jing
 Prince of Huainan
 Prince of Zhao
 Prince of Yan
 Prince of Wu

Established by Emperor Wen
 Prince of Liang
 Prince of Chengyang
 Prince of Jibei
 Prince of Zichuan
 Prince of Jinan
 Prince of Jiaodong
 Prince of Jiaoxi
 Prince of Hengshan
 Prince of Lujiang
 Prince of Hejian

Established by Emperor Jing
 Prince of Linjiang
 Prince of Jiangdu
 Prince of Changsha
 Prince of Zhongshan
 Prince of Guangchuan
 Prince of Qinghe
 Prince of Changshan
 Prince of Jichuan
 Prince of Jidong
 Prince of Shanyang
 Prince of Jiyin

Established by Emperor Wu
 Prince of Guangling
 Prince of Changyi
 Prince of Lu'an
 Prince of Zhending
 Prince of Sishui
 Prince of Pinggan

Established by Emperor Xuan
 Prince of Huaiyang
 Prince of Dongping
 Prince of Gaomi

Established by Emperor Yuan
 Prince of Dingtao

Established by Emperor Cheng
 Prince of Guangde

Established by Emperor Ai
 Prince of Guangping

Established by Emperor Ping
 Prince of Guangshi
 Prince of Guangzong

Crown Prince

The Crown Prince in the Han dynasty was the heir apparent to the throne. The Crown Prince was normally the eldest son of the Emperor and the Empress, but not always. The power to nominate the Crown Prince lay with the throne, although the Emperor generally had to obtain the advice or consent of his high ministers. The Crown Prince would not be given a princedom but instead lived with the Emperor in the capital. When a prince became heir apparent, his principality merged with the realm and became extinct. The Crown Prince could be dismissed and this did indeed happen several times in the Han dynasty.

List of Crown Princes
Crown Prince Ying, son of Emperor Gaozu of Han, later Emperor Hui
Crown Prince Qi, son of Emperor Wen of Han, later Emperor Jing
Crown Prince Rong, son of Emperor Jing of Han, later demoted to Prince of Linjiang
Crown Prince Che, son of Emperor Jing of Han, originally Prince of Jiaodong, later Emperor Wu
Crown Prince Li, son of Emperor Wu of Han, rebelled and killed
Crown Prince Fuling, son of Emperor Wu of Han, later Emperor Zhao
Crown Prince Shi, son of Emperor Xuan of Han, later Emperor Yuan
Crown Prince Ao, son of Emperor Yuan of Han, later Emperor Cheng
Crown Prince Xin, grandson of Emperor Yuan of Han, originally Prince of Dingtao, adopted by Emperor Cheng of Han and later Emperor Ai

See also
 History of the Han dynasty
 Chinese nobility
 Princes of the Ming dynasty
 Ancient Chinese states
 Eighteen Kingdoms
 Fengjian

Han dynasty
han
Chinese kings

Lists of leaders of China